Liland may refer to

Places

Norway
Liland, Bergen, a village in Bergen municipality, Hordaland county
Liland, Evenes, a village in Evenes municipality, Nordland county
Liland, Sortland, a village in Sortland municipality, Nordland county
Liland, Troms, a village in Nordreisa municipality, Troms county
Liland, Vestvågøy, a village in Vestvågøy municipality, Nordland county
Liland, Vågan, a village in Vågan municipality, Nordland county

People
Asbjørn Liland, a Norwegian politician
Hanne Liland, a retired racewalker from Norway

Other
Liland Affair, a famous Norwegian murder trial